Peter Cuddon may refer to:

Peter Cuddon (fl. 1372–1390), MP for Dunwich
Peter Cuddon (fl. 1399–1410), MP for Dunwich